Choi Da-seul (born April 25, 1988 in Seoul, South Korea), popularly known as Dasuri Choi, is a South Korean dancer and entertainer based in the Philippines. Dasuri won Best in Talent and is the 2nd Runner-up winner in the segment, "You're My Foreignay", of the longest-running noontime show in the Philippines, Eat Bulaga!.

Career
Dasuri is a former dancer of 홍영주 (Hong Yeong-ju) Dance Team from 2004 to 2006, "Step-up" from 2007 to 2009, "Yama & Hotchicks" from 2009 to 2010, and Dance Trainee (choreographer) profession from South Korea.

In 2014, Dasuri auditioned on Eat Bulaga!'s "You're My Foreignay", together with South Korean actress and the segment's Grand Winner, Kuk Son-young.

From 2015 to present, she is joined by comedian Boobay and main host Julie Anne San Jose in the TV series "Day Off", a reality/lifestyle program airing on GMA News TV. Dasuri also appeared in Yam Concepcion's September 2015 issue of FHM Philippines.

Filmography

Television

Music video

Awards

References

External links
 
 
 

1994 births
Living people
South Korean television actresses
South Korean expatriates in the Philippines
South Korean television personalities
21st-century South Korean singers
People from Seoul
GMA Network personalities